Acraea magnifica is a butterfly in the family Nymphalidae. It is found in Kenya, from the northern part of the country to Mount Marsabit and Mount Kulal.

Acraea magnifica is a member of the Acraea zetes   species group   -   but see also Pierre & Bernaud, 2014

References

Butterflies described in 1950
magnifica
Endemic insects of Kenya
Butterflies of Africa